Belfius Mons-Hainaut is a Belgian professional basketball club that is based in Mons, Wallonia. The club competes in the highest division of the country, the BNXT League. The club's home arena is the Mons Arena. Founded as Quaregnon in 1959, the club has been a regular in the Belgian first division as the club plays in the highest tier for  years, since the 1990–91 season. Mons-Hainaut also participated in European competitions annually, mostly in the FIBA Europe Cup.

History
The club won the Belgian Cup in 2006, and reached the Belgian national league's final the same season. In 2008, Dexia Mons-Hainaut was the EuroChallenge runner-up. They won their second Belgian Cup in 2011.

Since the 2021–22 season, Mons-Hainaut plays in the BNXT League, in which the national leagues of Belgium and the Netherlands have been merged.

Titles and honors
Belgian League
Runners-up (6): 2005–06, 2008–09, 2010–11, 2014–15, 2019–20, 2020–21

Belgian Cup 
Winners (2): 2005–06, 2010–11
Runners-up (1): 2007–08

Belgian Supercup
Winners (1): 2011
Runners-up (1): 2006

Season by season

Players

Current roster

Notable players

Head coaches
 Chris Finch (2007–2009)
 Arik Shivek (2009–2012)
 Yves Defraigne (2012–2017)
 Vedran Bosnić (2019–Present)

Arena
Home games are played in Mons.Arena, where there is place for 3,700 people per game.

Sponsorship naming and logos
Due to sponsorship reasons, the team has been known as:
Dexia Mons-Hainaut (2001–2012)
Belfius Mons-Hainaut (2012–present)
The club has also used several logos:

References

External links
 

Basketball teams in Belgium
Basketball teams established in 1959
Pro Basketball League
1959 establishments in Belgium
Sport in Mons